Miss Alaska USA, previously known as Miss Alaska Universe, is the beauty pageant that selects the representative for the state of Alaska in the Miss USA pageant, and the name of the title held by its winner. The pageant is directed by Garness Productions.

Alaska's most successful placement was in 1964, when Patricia Marlin placed as the second runner-up. Alaska's most recent placement was in 2017, when Alyssa London placed in the Top 10. Alaska ties with Texas as the states with the most wins in the pageant's history for "Best State Costume."   

Jordan Naylor of Anchorage was crowned Miss Alaska USA 2023 on January 14, 2023 at Bartlett High School Auditorium in Anchorage. Naylor will represent Alaska at Miss USA 2023.

Gallery of titleholders

Results summary

Placements in Miss USA
2nd Runner-Up: Patricia Marlin (1964)
Top 6: Karin Meyer (1990)
Top 10/12: Patricia Lane (1972), Barbara Samuelson (1978), Alyssa London (2017)

Awards
Miss Congeniality: Toni Lynn McFadden (1982), Kimberly Agron (2015), Courtney Schuman (2022)
Miss Photogenic: Courtney Carroll (2008)
Best State Costume: Carla Sullivan (1965), Linda Louise Rowley (1969), Katherine Hartman (1971), Patricia Lane (1972)

Winners
Color key

Notes

References

External links
 

Annual events in Alaska
Lists of people from Alaska
Alaska
Women in Alaska
1952 establishments in Alaska
Recurring events established in 1952